The Korkino constituency (No.191) is a Russian legislative constituency in Chelyabinsk Oblast. Until 2007 the constituency covered parts of Chelyabinsk and its suburbs, however, in 2015 the constituency was reconfigured to Chelyabinsk's southern suburbs and exurbs.

Members elected

Election results

1993

|-
! colspan=2 style="background-color:#E9E9E9;text-align:left;vertical-align:top;" |Candidate
! style="background-color:#E9E9E9;text-align:left;vertical-align:top;" |Party
! style="background-color:#E9E9E9;text-align:right;" |Votes
! style="background-color:#E9E9E9;text-align:right;" |%
|-
|style="background-color:#EA3C38"|
|align=left|Vladimir Utkin
|align=left|Civic Union
|
|39.32%
|-
|style="background-color:"|
|align=left|Larisa Subbotina
|align=left|Independent
| -
|24.30%
|-
| colspan="5" style="background-color:#E9E9E9;"|
|- style="font-weight:bold"
| colspan="3" style="text-align:left;" | Total
| 
| 100%
|-
| colspan="5" style="background-color:#E9E9E9;"|
|- style="font-weight:bold"
| colspan="4" |Source:
|
|}

1995

|-
! colspan=2 style="background-color:#E9E9E9;text-align:left;vertical-align:top;" |Candidate
! style="background-color:#E9E9E9;text-align:left;vertical-align:top;" |Party
! style="background-color:#E9E9E9;text-align:right;" |Votes
! style="background-color:#E9E9E9;text-align:right;" |%
|-
|style="background-color:#2C299A"|
|align=left|Vladimir Utkin (incumbent)
|align=left|Congress of Russian Communities
|
|39.04%
|-
|style="background-color:"|
|align=left|Aleksandr Kuznetsov
|align=left|Yabloko
|
|10.00%
|-
|style="background-color:"|
|align=left|Fyodor Klyuyev
|align=left|Our Home – Russia
|
|9.83%
|-
|style="background-color:#FF4400"|
|align=left|Lyubov Patrakova
|align=left|Party of Workers' Self-Government
|
|6.75%
|-
|style="background-color:"|
|align=left|Vladimir Gruzdev
|align=left|Liberal Democratic Party
|
|5.72%
|-
|style="background-color:#DA2021"|
|align=left|Andrey Belishko
|align=left|Ivan Rybkin Bloc
|
|5.37%
|-
|style="background-color:"|
|align=left|Igor Belekhov
|align=left|Independent
|
|4.90%
|-
|style="background-color:#3A46CE"|
|align=left|Aleksandr Vorobyev
|align=left|Democratic Choice of Russia – United Democrats
|
|4.89%
|-
|style="background-color:"|
|align=left|Vasily Kubashov
|align=left|Revival
|
|1.40%
|-
|style="background-color:#000000"|
|colspan=2 |against all
|
|9.63%
|-
| colspan="5" style="background-color:#E9E9E9;"|
|- style="font-weight:bold"
| colspan="3" style="text-align:left;" | Total
| 
| 100%
|-
| colspan="5" style="background-color:#E9E9E9;"|
|- style="font-weight:bold"
| colspan="4" |Source:
|
|}

1997 June
After Vladimir Utkin was appointed Chairman of the Government of Chelyabinsk Oblast in February 1997 he had to give up his seat in the State Duma. A by-election was scheduled for 29 June 1997 with the concurrent by-election in the Kyshtym constituency. The by-election in Sovetsky constituency was won by Valery Gartung, however, the results were annulled due to low turnout (21.80%) and another election was scheduled for 14 December 1997.

1997 December

|-
! colspan=2 style="background-color:#E9E9E9;text-align:left;vertical-align:top;" |Candidate
! style="background-color:#E9E9E9;text-align:left;vertical-align:top;" |Party
! style="background-color:#E9E9E9;text-align:right;" |Votes
! style="background-color:#E9E9E9;text-align:right;" |%
|-
|style="background-color:"|
|align=left|Valery Gartung
|align=left|Independent
|-
|43.52%
|-
| colspan="5" style="background-color:#E9E9E9;"|
|- style="font-weight:bold"
| colspan="3" style="text-align:left;" | Total
| -
| 100%
|-
| colspan="5" style="background-color:#E9E9E9;"|
|- style="font-weight:bold"
| colspan="4" |Source:
|
|}

1999

|-
! colspan=2 style="background-color:#E9E9E9;text-align:left;vertical-align:top;" |Candidate
! style="background-color:#E9E9E9;text-align:left;vertical-align:top;" |Party
! style="background-color:#E9E9E9;text-align:right;" |Votes
! style="background-color:#E9E9E9;text-align:right;" |%
|-
|style="background-color:"|
|align=left|Valery Gartung (incumbent)
|align=left|Independent
|
|37.02%
|-
|style="background-color:"|
|align=left|Aleksandr Aristov
|align=left|Independent
|
|34.65%
|-
|style="background-color:"|
|align=left|Ivan Shchedrin
|align=left|Communist Party
|
|9.56%
|-
|style="background-color:"|
|align=left|Rafail Shafigulin
|align=left|Independent
|
|4.36%
|-
|style="background-color:"|
|align=left|Yury Rudakov
|align=left|Independent
|
|1.55%
|-
|style="background-color:"|
|align=left|Sergey Kazimirov
|align=left|Independent
|
|1.01%
|-
|style="background-color:"|
|align=left|Sergey Shutyuk
|align=left|Independent
|
|0.84%
|-
|style="background-color:"|
|align=left|Mikhail Kotelnikov
|align=left|Liberal Democratic Party
|
|0.77%
|-
|style="background-color:"|
|align=left|Gennady Pskov
|align=left|Independent
|
|0.49%
|-
|style="background-color:"|
|align=left|Vladimir Bukhdruker
|align=left|Independent
|
|0.35%
|-
|style="background-color:#000000"|
|colspan=2 |against all
|
|7.70%
|-
| colspan="5" style="background-color:#E9E9E9;"|
|- style="font-weight:bold"
| colspan="3" style="text-align:left;" | Total
| 
| 100%
|-
| colspan="5" style="background-color:#E9E9E9;"|
|- style="font-weight:bold"
| colspan="4" |Source:
|
|}

2003

|-
! colspan=2 style="background-color:#E9E9E9;text-align:left;vertical-align:top;" |Candidate
! style="background-color:#E9E9E9;text-align:left;vertical-align:top;" |Party
! style="background-color:#E9E9E9;text-align:right;" |Votes
! style="background-color:#E9E9E9;text-align:right;" |%
|-
|style="background-color:"|
|align=left|Valery Gartung (incumbent)
|align=left|Independent
|
|68.50%
|-
|style="background-color:"|
|align=left|Stanislav Popotsov
|align=left|Communist Party
|
|6.73%
|-
|style="background-color:"|
|align=left|Mikhail Kotelnikov
|align=left|Liberal Democratic Party
|
|3.85%
|-
|style="background-color: " |
|align=left|Aleksey Tabalov
|align=left|Yabloko
|
|3.85%
|-
|style="background-color:#D50000"|
|align=left|Viktor Pinzhenin
|align=left|Russian Communist Workers Party-Russian Party of Communists
|
|1.63%
|-
|style="background-color:"|
|align=left|Oleg Kurichev
|align=left|Agrarian Party
|
|1.42%
|-
|style="background-color:"|
|align=left|Mikhail Akhromenko
|align=left|Independent
|
|0.84%
|-
|style="background-color:#000000"|
|colspan=2 |against all
|
|11.60%
|-
| colspan="5" style="background-color:#E9E9E9;"|
|- style="font-weight:bold"
| colspan="3" style="text-align:left;" | Total
| 
| 100%
|-
| colspan="5" style="background-color:#E9E9E9;"|
|- style="font-weight:bold"
| colspan="4" |Source:
|
|}

2016

|-
! colspan=2 style="background-color:#E9E9E9;text-align:left;vertical-align:top;" |Candidate
! style="background-color:#E9E9E9;text-align:leftt;vertical-align:top;" |Party
! style="background-color:#E9E9E9;text-align:right;" |Votes
! style="background-color:#E9E9E9;text-align:right;" |%
|-
| style="background-color: " |
|align=left|Anatoly Litovchenko
|align=left|United Russia
|
|37.73%
|-
| style="background-color: " |
|align=left|Valery Gartung
|align=left|A Just Russia
|
|34.51%
|-
|style="background-color:"|
|align=left|Sergey Shargunov
|align=left|Communist Party
|
|7.89%
|-
|style="background-color:"|
|align=left|Andrey Samokhvalov
|align=left|Liberal Democratic Party
|
|7.54%
|-
|style="background-color:"|
|align=left|Nikolay Yarovoy
|align=left|Communists of Russia
|
|2.77%
|-
|style="background-color:"|
|align=left|Valeria Prikhodkina
|align=left|People's Freedom Party
|
|1.93%
|-
|style="background-color: " |
|align=left|Yaroslav Shcherbakov
|align=left|Yabloko
|
|1.93%
|-
|style="background-color:"|
|align=left|Dmitry Gorbachyov
|align=left|Party of Growth
|
|1.31%
|-
|style="background-color:"|
|align=left|Konstantin Gritsenko
|align=left|Patriots of Russia
|
|0.79%
|-
| colspan="5" style="background-color:#E9E9E9;"|
|- style="font-weight:bold"
| colspan="3" style="text-align:left;" | Total
| 
| 100%
|-
| colspan="5" style="background-color:#E9E9E9;"|
|- style="font-weight:bold"
| colspan="4" |Source:
|
|}

2021

|-
! colspan=2 style="background-color:#E9E9E9;text-align:left;vertical-align:top;" |Candidate
! style="background-color:#E9E9E9;text-align:left;vertical-align:top;" |Party
! style="background-color:#E9E9E9;text-align:right;" |Votes
! style="background-color:#E9E9E9;text-align:right;" |%
|-
|style="background-color: " |
|align=left|Valery Gartung
|align=left|A Just Russia — For Truth
|
|46.78%
|-
|style="background-color:"|
|align=left|Anton Ryzhy
|align=left|United Russia
|
|16.92%
|-
|style="background-color:"|
|align=left|Stepanida Smirnova
|align=left|Communist Party
|
|10.56%
|-
|style="background-color:"|
|align=left|Igor Vazhenin
|align=left|New People
|
|6.29%
|-
|style="background-color:"|
|align=left|Aleksey Besedin
|align=left|Liberal Democratic Party
|
|4.12%
|-
|style="background-color: "|
|align=left|Igor Roslyakov
|align=left|Party of Pensioners
|
|3.38%
|-
|style="background-color: " |
|align=left|Natalya Tavrina
|align=left|Yabloko
|
|2.03%
|-
|style="background-color:"|
|align=left|Sergey Krylov
|align=left|Rodina
|
|1.58%
|-
|style="background-color: "|
|align=left|Vladislav Dolgov
|align=left|Russian Party of Freedom and Justice
|
|1.56%
|-
|style="background-color:"|
|align=left|Yevgeny Yevseyev
|align=left|Party of Growth
|
|1.31%
|-
|style="background-color:"|
|align=left|Anastasia Nikonova
|align=left|Civic Platform
|
|1.16%
|-
| colspan="5" style="background-color:#E9E9E9;"|
|- style="font-weight:bold"
| colspan="3" style="text-align:left;" | Total
| 
| 100%
|-
| colspan="5" style="background-color:#E9E9E9;"|
|- style="font-weight:bold"
| colspan="4" |Source:
|
|}

Notes

References

Russian legislative constituencies
Politics of Chelyabinsk Oblast